Monaco City is the southcentral ward in the Principality of Monaco. Located on a headland that extends into the Mediterranean Sea, it is nicknamed The Rock. The name "Monaco City" is misleading: it is not itself a city, but a historical and statistical district. It holds most of the country's political and judicial institutions: the Prince's Palace, the town hall, the government, the National Council (parliament of Monaco), the Municipal Council, the courts and a prison (hanging on The Rock).

Geography
Monaco City is one of the four traditional quarters of Monaco; the others are La Condamine, Monte Carlo, and Fontvieille. It has 19.64 hectares of surface and is located between the districts of Fontvieille and La Condamine.

History

Monaco Ville was originally called in Greek Monoikos, after the temple of Hercules Monoikos, located in a Phocaean colony of the 6th century BCE. During its history, Monoikos changed hands numerous times. It became Monaco in the Middle Ages. Some of the city walls and original structures still remain.

It was here that the Phocaeans of Massalia (now Marseille) founded the colony of Monoïkos in the 6th century BC. Monoikos was associated with Hercules, who was worshipped as Hercules Monoecus. According to the works of Hercules, but also according to Diodorus of Sicily and Strabo, the Greeks and the Ligurians reported that Hercules had passed through the region.

On 10 June 1215, a detachment of Ghibellines led by Fulco del Cassello began the construction of a fortress on the rock of Monaco in order to make it a strategic military position and a means of controlling the area.

They also established dwellings at the base of the Rock to support the garrisons. To attract the inhabitants of Genoa and the surrounding towns, they offered land and exempted newcomers from taxes.

On January 8, 1297, François Grimaldi, descendant of Otto Canella, consul of Genoa in 1133, took over the fortress. Although he had a small army, he disguised himself as a Franciscan monk to enter, before opening the gates to his soldiers. This episode gave rise to his nickname, Malizia ("malice"). This is why today the arms of Monaco bear two Franciscans armed with a sword.

Landmarks
Despite being located in the middle of the City of Monaco, the world's most densely populated urban center, Monaco City remains a medieval village at heart, made up almost entirely of quiet pedestrian streets and marked by virtual silence after sundown. Though innumerable people visit Monaco City and the palace square, only local vehicles are allowed up to the Rock, and gasoline-powered motorcycles are prohibited after 10 pm.

Prince's Palace of Monaco. The colorful changing of the guard occurs every day outside the Palais at 11:55 am.
Cathedral of Our Lady Immaculate, a Romanesque-Byzantine Catholic church that contains the remains of many members of Monaco's ruling family.
The Oceanographic Museum, established by Albert I, Prince of Monaco in 1910.
Chapel of Mercy, built in 1639, one of the oldest buildings in the principality. It is famous for being the starting point of a torchlit religious procession by local residents that takes place on the eve of Good Friday each year.
St Martin Gardens, a small park of rocky paths that cling to the rock.
Museum of the Chapel of Visitation, a 17th-century Roman Catholic chapel and art museum.
Fort Antoine Theatre, an amphitheater at the bottom of the rock.

Notable residents

Beatrice Borromeo; Italian journalist and socialite 
Andrea Casiraghi; Monégasque royal
Charlotte Casiraghi; Monégasque royal
Pierre Casiraghi; Monégasque royal  
Stefano Casiraghi; Italian socialite 
Tatiana Casiraghi; Colombian-American socialite 
Ghislaine Dommanget; French actress, Princess of Monaco 
Daniel Ducruet; Carabinier in the Compagnie des Carabiniers du Prince 
Louis Ducruet; Monégasque royal 
Gad Elmaleh; Moroccan actor 
Philippe Gilbert; Belgian cyclist
Camille Gottlieb; Monégasque royal   
Jean-Raymond Gottlieb; Carabinier in the Compagnie des Carabiniers du Prince
Albert Grimaldi; Prince of Monaco 
Caroline Grimaldi; Princess of Hanover, Princess of Monaco
Gabriella Grimaldi; Princess of Monaco
Jacques Grimaldi; Prince of Monaco 
Rainier Grimaldi; Prince of Monaco 
Stéphanie Grimaldi; Princess of Monaco 
Alexandra Hanover; Princess of Hanover 
Grace Kelly; American actress, Princess of Monaco 
Charlene Wittstock; South African swimmer, Princess of Monaco

Gallery

See also
Municipality of Monaco

References

External links

Quarters of Monaco